Fitzwilliam Darcy, Gentleman is the collective name given to a trilogy of historical romance novels written by Pamela Aidan. As the title suggests, they are based heavily on Jane Austen's 1813 novel Pride and Prejudice, and feature many events of the novel as seen from the perspective of Mr. Fitzwilliam Darcy, the central male character of Austen's novel.

Overview
The trilogy of novels (was up) explores Darcy's perspective on the events of Pride and Prejudice - in particular focusing on his developing relationship with and feelings for Elizabeth Bennet, the protagonist of the earlier novel. However, the novels also explore Darcy's character, life and interests within the social and political world of his time, and introduce in prominent roles characters who only briefly appeared in the earlier work or were not present at all, thus expanding on Darcy's life and character.

As with Pride and Prejudice, the central conflict within Darcy's character in the series is his attempts to reconcile his feelings for Elizabeth Bennet with his own pride and reservations about her social standing and family, and the effect this would have on his own stature.

While Pride and Prejudice does not mention actual dates for its events, the first three novels are set in a period starting in late 1811, based on dates shown in various letters between the characters.  They reference historical events including the War of 1812 with the United States of America, the assassination of the British Prime Minister, Spencer Perceval, the Luddite raids, and the Ratcliff Highway murders, referred to as having taken place in Wapping.  Historical characters also appear, such as Beau Brummel and Lady Caroline Lamb.  Austen's own first novel Sense and Sensibility, published in 1811, is obliquely referred to in the second novel, Duty and Desire.

Novels 
The trilogy is composed of the following works:

An Assembly Such as This: First published in 2003, the first novel focuses on Darcy's initial visit to Hertfordshire, as depicted in the opening chapters of Pride and Prejudice.
 Duty and Desire: Originally published in 2004, the second novel focuses on the period of time when Darcy is absent from Pride and Prejudice following his departure from Hertfordshire and before he reappears at Rosings Park.
 These Three Remain First published in 2005, the final novel in the trilogy focuses on Darcy as he appeared in the later chapters in Pride and Prejudice from his reappearing in the narrative at Rosings Park.
 Young Master Darcy: A Lesson in Honour Published in 2010, a short story about the Darcy of Aidan's books as a young boy.

Plot summaries

Book 1 - An Assembly Such as This 
Fitzwilliam Darcy, although a mere 27-year-old gentleman, is the master of an impressive estate in Derbyshire called Pemberley (income of 10,000 pounds a year).  One of Darcy's best friends in London, 23-year-old Charles Bingley, whose inheritance (100,000 pounds or 5,000 pounds a year) was earned by his father in a trade (not completely respectable), is considering the purchase of a country estate in Hertfordshire called Netherfield.  Bingley rents Netherfield for a year, and Darcy travels with Bingley to Netherfield to evaluate the operations of the estate and the prospects for a satisfying lifestyle in this Hertfordshire.
  
The story begins with Darcy and Bingley's traveling party (Bingley, his sister Caroline, and his other sister and her husband Mr. and Mrs. Hurst) arriving at the Meryton Assembly for a country ball.  Bingley, new to the community, is an outgoing person without any pretensions, and thus is much looking forward to having a great time.  By contrast, Darcy is quite reserved and stiffly formal, and he expects the jovial informality of a country ball among ill-bred strangers will make for an arduous, unpleasant evening.  Caroline and the Hursts are elitist snobs and expect to be bored with the insignificant locals.

At the ball, Bingley eagerly solicits introductions and dances the night away with the local girls.  He is quickly infatuated with 22-year-old Miss Jane Bennet.  Darcy declines to be introduced to any local girls because Jane is the only “handsome” local girl, and instead dances only with Bingley's sisters.  When Bingley suggests to Darcy that he dance with Jane's younger 20-year-old sister Elizabeth, who is currently sitting out the dance, Darcy snubs her with his assessment – “She is tolerable, but not handsome enough to tempt me; and I am in no humor at present to give consequence to young ladies who are slighted by other men.”  Unfortunately, for all concerned, Elizabeth Bennet overhears the comment.

After the ball, the Bingley sisters take great joy in ridiculing the fashion and conversation of the locals, especially Mrs. Bennet  Although Darcy is not as supercilious as the sisters, he agrees with them that Elizabeth as a reputed beauty is over-rated – “She a beauty?  I would as soon call her mother a wit?”

Over the next two weeks, Bingley's party and Darcy attend several private get-to-know-you events that invariably include the popular Bennet family from Longbourn (2,000 pounds a year) – Mr. and Mrs. Bennet, Jane, Elizabeth, and three younger daughters, Mary, Kitty, and Lydia.  During these events, Darcy comes to believe that he dismissed Elizabeth too quickly.  He observes her to have wit, grace, compassion, intelligence, and, unlike her mother and younger sisters, manners.  He also notices her beauty that initially escaped his notice because he was in a surly mood.  As an added bonus, she sings a wonderful soprano at Sunday church services.

During the various informal events, Darcy has occasion to engage in conversation with Elizabeth, and although he intends to show a modest interest in her, she invariably turns the conversations into verbal swordplay.  This is Elizabeth's modus operandi whenever she deals with pretentious people like Caroline Bingley.  By contrast, she is playful and warm when she deals with people like Charles Bingley, who is quickly falling in love with her older sister Jane.

Because of Charles's obvious interest in Miss Jane Bennet, the Bingley sisters invite her to Netherfield for lunch, but on her three-mile ride she is caught in a rainstorm and catches a bad cold, which requires her to recuperate at Netherfield for almost a week.  Elizabeth walks to Netherfield and stays for the duration to nurse Jane.  During the stay, Elizabeth and Darcy continue to engage in verbal swordplay, but he can't but be impressed by her qualities and character.  Darcy writes a letter to his 15-year-old sister Georgiana in Pemberley and remarks about the remarkable visitor, Miss Elizabeth Bennet, who makes him sound and act foolishly.

Darcy begins to reject Caroline Bingley's continual criticism of Elizabeth as unattractive.  Nearing the end of Jane and Elizabeth's stay at Netherfield, Darcy and Elizabeth happen to be sharing the library for a while, and after Elizabeth leaves, Darcy's curiosity gets the best of him and he locates the book that Elizabeth was reading, Milton's Paradise Lost, and purloins her embroidery-thread book mark as a keepsake.

Bingley agrees to have a big, formal ball at Netherfield as soon as Jane recovers.  Shortly after Jane returns to her home Longbourn, Darcy receives a letter from sister Georgiana in which she expresses interest in his new friend.

Darcy plans to use the ball as opportunity to get a fresh start with Elizabeth.  Shortly before the ball, however, Elizabeth becomes acquainted with a childhood friend of Darcy's, George Wickham, who slanders Darcy with gross falsehoods.  Because Wickham is a charming scoundrel, and because Darcy has been relatively unpleasant since his first impression on Elizabeth, she chooses to believe the worst about Darcy without any sort of confirmation.  Thus, when Darcy asks Elizabeth to dance at the Netherfield ball, she civilly accepts, but then launches into a most disagreeable conversation.

During Darcy's dance with Elizabeth, they are interrupted by the locally prominent Sir Lucas, who thinks he is being complimentary in declaring them a handsome couple and suggesting a future alliance of Charles Bingley and Miss Jane Bennet.  Later, at the post-dance supper, Darcy hears Mrs. Bennet loudly brag that her daughter Jane will soon to marry Darcy's rich friend, Charles Bingley.

After the ball, Darcy and Bingley's sister Caroline discuss her brother's infatuation with Jane and agree that such an alliance will be disastrous for him. To prevent the alliance, they further agree to get him back to London and, once there, Darcy will convince him that the emotional connection is slight and the practical drawbacks are huge.  Although Darcy still feels drawn to Elizabeth, his problems with her cause him to think he is doing Bingley a favor by separating him from Hertfordshire and the Bennets.

Back in London, Darcy quickly convinces Bingley that his emotional connection with Miss Jane Bennet is slight and the practical drawbacks of such an alliance are huge.  Thus, their separation should be permanent.

Book 3 - These Three Remain 
Darcy and his cousin Richard Fitzwilliam travel every spring to Kent to assist their aunt Lady Catherine in the management of her estate Rosings Park.  During their coach ride from London, Fitzwilliam notices Darcy forlornly fingering Elizabeth's embroidery-thread bookmark, and he insists on hearing the romantic story associated with it.  To avoid telling Fitzwilliam the truth, Darcy quickly decides on providing him an alternate story about how he saved one of his best friends from an imprudent marriage.  The story satisfies Fitzwilliam's curiosity and increases his estimation of Darcy.

Upon arriving, Darcy and Fitzwilliam learn that their aunt's rector, William Collins, has a visitor from Hertfordshire, Miss Elizabeth Bennet.  Over the course of week, through dinners, teas, parsonage visits, and especially shared walks on the Rosings grounds, Darcy comes to admire Elizabeth even more.  Although Elizabeth continues to tease him in company, the sharp edge on her words has disappeared.  And their conversations in private are civil and genuine.

All things considered (Darcy accuses himself of acting like a “miserly accountant, adding up the assets of his lady on one side of the ledger”) Darcy concludes that (1) he admires Elizabeth, (2) he is attracted to her, (3) he is fascinated by her conversation and wit, and finally (4) he loves her.  And when he thinks of negative factors, he recalled Shakespeare's, “Let me not to the marriage of true minds admit impediments.”

Darcy begins to fear that, if he does not take action, he will lose this treasure.  He must act now.  Despite the social drawbacks associated with marrying Elizabeth, Darcy decides to offer his hand, but, once again, his timing could not be worse because the day before his offer, she learns from Fitzwilliam (unintentionally) of Darcy's dominant role in purposely separating Bingley from his sister Jane.  Thus, when Darcy asks Elizabeth's hand, she rejects him out of hand based primarily on his role in separating Jane and Bingley and also because of his scandalous treatment of Wickham.

The morning after Elizabeth's rejection of his hand, Darcy gives Elizabeth a lengthy letter, in which he attempts to explain his actions regarding Bingley and Wickham, the latter of which he thinks much more serious.  According to Darcy, his action toward Bingley was done with the best intentions of protecting his friend from acting rashly.  It was a judgment call.  By contrast, Elizabeth's information regarding Wickham is entirely and objectively false, and this can be verified easily by anyone with an interest in knowing the truth.  Darcy leaves Rosings Park the day after the letter without speaking to Elizabeth, and Elizabeth leaves a few days later, neither expecting to see each other again.

Not surprisingly, Darcy is a morose, depressed mess in London and Pemberley.  In London, he gets drunk with an old college friend, Dy Brougham, and cries in his beer about Elizabeth's rejection of his proposal that he made despite his concerns.  In Pemberley, Darcy acts rudely and brusquely and finally explains to Georgiana that his misbehavior is due to his disappointment over Elizabeth's rejection.  After he describes what happened at Rosings Park, Georgiana commiserates with Darcy, but can provide no reason to hope.

Weeks later Darcy returns to Pemberley from London and discovers Elizabeth and her aunt and uncle Gardiner touring the Pemberley grounds.  They are on a summer vacation tour of Derbyshire and its great estates, and decided to tour Pemberley after Elizabeth confirmed that its master, Darcy, is away in London.  Darcy graciously guides Elizabeth and the Gardiners through the remainder of the estate, before asking Elizabeth if he can introduce her to his sister Georgiana in two days when she returns from London.  Elizabeth and the Gardiners agree, and eventually they meet Georgiana.  During this time, Elizabeth notices that the stiff, proud gentleman she had perceived in Hertfordshire is no more.  And even the haughty, proud man from Rosings Park is gone.  Instead, she sees a well-mannered, considerate, and well-respected gentleman.

Darcy is well on his way character rehabilitation when Elizabeth receives urgent letters from home informing her that her 15-year-old baby sister Lydia has been seduced by the evil Wickham and is missing.  A distraught Elizabeth bares her plight to Darcy, and then returns with the Gardiners to Hertfordshire to see what can be done.

Darcy feels some responsibility for what Wickham has done because he had not revealed Wickham upon his arrival in Hertfordshire, and this feeling prompts him to try to find Wickham and Lydia in London and work something out.  Simultaneously, Mr. Bennet and Uncle Gardiner are trying to do the same thing, but they fail, while Darcy succeeds by using his connections and money, especially with a Mrs. Younge, who was implicated in Wickham's attempted seduction of Georgiana.  After being bribed, she leads Darcy to Wickham and Lydia.  Over several discussions, Darcy is unable to persuade Lydia to abandon Wickham, so Darcy is forced to bribe Wickham to marry Lydia.  Darcy brings the proposed deal to Uncle Gardiner, who grudgingly agrees to allow Darcy to pay for the deal anonymously.  The deal includes paying off Wickham's debts and buying him an officer's commission in the army.  In return, Lydia and Wickham marry.

Shortly after Lydia's marriage, Bingley informs Darcy that the one-year lease on Netherfield is about to expire.  Darcy suggests that they take a second look at the property, and Bingley quickly agrees.  Bingley never mention anything about Jane being in the area, and Darcy never mentions anything about Elizabeth in the area.

Upon their return to Hertfordshire, Bingley and Darcy formally call on the Bennets at their estate Longbourn.  During that visit, Darcy and Elizabeth behave formally, but Bingley and Jane quickly restart their affection for each other.  During a subsequent visit, Darcy is persuaded that Bingley and Jane's affection is genuine and lasting, and thereupon confesses to Bingley of his previous treachery in splitting the couple.  Based on this new information, Bingley promptly asks Jane to make him the luckiest man, and she accepts.  Because Elizabeth has given Darcy no indication that her feelings toward him had changed, Darcy returns to London.  He is unwilling to chance a second rejection.

While in London, Darcy commiserates again with his college friend, Dyfed Brougham.  After Darcy describes what happened in Longbourn, Dy encourages him to think that Elizabeth had treated him with reserve because she was still embarrassed and that there is still a chance.

Upon his returned to his Erewile House in London, Darcy finds Lady Catherine waiting for him.  Apparently, the imminent marriage of Jane to Bingley had led others in the Meryton community to believe that nuptials for Darcy and Elizabeth won't be far behind, and these unfounded rumors reached Rosings Park, where Darcy's aunt Lady Catherine was aghast because she has marital plans for her daughter and Darcy.  When Elizabeth in Longbourn did not allay Lady Catherine's concerns, she traveled to London to confront Darcy, who tries to calm his aunt by noting that rumors like this are not unprecedented.  But when Lady Catherine admits that she has already talked to Elizabeth, Darcy becomes extremely agitated.  And when Lady Catherine admits that Elizabeth refused to say she would reject a proposal, Darcy becomes extremely intrigued.  Could there be a chance, he thinks.

Darcy rides to Longbourn and goes on a walk with Elizabeth.  Darcy – “You are too generous to trifle with me. If your feelings are still what they were last April, tell me so at once. My affections and wishes are unchanged, but one word from you will silence me on this subject for ever.”  Elizabeth – “Mr. Darcy.  Please… my feelings…  My feelings have undergone so material a change since that unfortunate day last spring that I can only receive with sincere gratitude and the most profound pleasure your assurances that yours continue the same.”

Darcy asks dad Mr. Bennet for Elizabeth's hand.  Dad can't believe it.

Darcy and Elizabeth have a charming and playful discussion of their love.  Elizabeth – “When did you begin to fall in love with me?  I can comprehend your going on charmingly, when you had once made a beginning; but what could set you off in the first place?”  Darcy – “I cannot fix on the hour, or the spot, or the look, or the words, which laid the foundation. It is too long ago. I was in the middle before I knew that I had begun.”  Elizabeth – “My beauty you had early withstood, and as for my manners—my behaviour to you was at least always bordering on the uncivil, and I never spoke to you without rather wishing to give you pain than not. Now be sincere; did you admire me for my impertinence?”  Darcy – “For the liveliness of your mind, I did.”

Double marriage at Meryton church – Jane Bennet and Charles Bingley; Elizabeth Bennet and Fitzwilliam Darcy.

Characters 
As the Fitzwilliam Darcy, Gentleman is essentially a retelling of Pride and Prejudice, many of the main characters of the novels appeared previously in Austen's original work. However, as the novels are presented as being from Darcy's point of view, several of these characters are given more prominence and significance within Aiden's novels than they were in the original novel, and events that were not immediately known to the reader of Austen's work are given instant focus and development within Aiden's. The novels also feature several original characters who did not appear in Austen's original works.

Fitzwilliam Darcy is the central character of the novels. A proud, wealthy yet reserved and formal man, the novels focus primary on his developing yet conflicted feelings towards Elizabeth Bennet and his various attempts to either forget her or secure her affections.  His romantic dilemma covers a larger struggle between his instilled ideas of acceptable behavior and his true decency of character.  Away from his interaction with the Bennets, Darcy is depicted as intelligent and industrious.  He willingly attends to his affairs both in London and Derbyshire and sets out to educate Charles Bingley in the management of country estates.  His London interests include the shipping of cargo through the docks.  At Cambridge Darcy competed with his friend Dyfed Brougham for prizes in mathematics.  Darcy was also a champion swordsman at Cambridge, a fact which plays a major role in the second novel.

Elizabeth Bennet is a young and attractive daughter of a gentleman with relatively modest estate who (initially at least) holds Darcy in some disdain due to his manners. She is Darcy's romantic interest throughout the novels, and a central theme of the books is Darcy's attempts to reconcile his feelings for her with his qualms about her class and family. She is the central character of Pride and Prejudice, and as with Darcy in the earlier novel, she is absent for long stretches of the overall narrative (and does not appear at all within the second book), but is a central background presence within all of the novels.

Fletcher is Darcy's valet, who does not appear in Pride and Prejudice. He is an intelligent and talented man who is very loyal to Darcy, who clearly appreciates him in return despite his reserved manner and his formal approach to the relationship between master and servant. He is quick to see both his master's feelings for Elizabeth Bennet and the appropriateness of the match, and makes several discreet attempts at matchmaking between the two during the novels - attempts that Darcy does not entirely appreciate.  Fletcher has his own interests at stake, including his desire to marry a young girl from Meryton.  Fletcher and Darcy quote Shakespeare at each other.  It is revealed that Fletcher's knowledge comes from his parents, who were once actors.  We also learn, in the third novel, that Fletcher's given name is "Lemuel".

Georgiana Darcy is Darcy's beloved younger sister, who appears in Pride and Prejudice (although her character is fleshed out in more detail within this trilogy). A shy and reserved girl, she recently suffered heartbreak at the hands of George Wickham, Darcy's nemesis, who attempted to elope with her for her vast fortune. A subplot of the trilogy focuses on Georgiana's gradual maturation with the help of the religious teachings of her new governess, Mrs. Annesley, which both pleases and bemuses Darcy.

Lord Dyfed 'Dy' Brougham is a good friend of Darcy's, who does not appear in Pride and Prejudice. An old university friend of Darcy's, he hides a quick-witted intelligence and sensitive nature behind a seemingly foppish exterior and reputation, and is very socially active. Brougham is eventually revealed to be an espionage agent employed by the Home Secretary; he is in many ways reminiscent of Percy Blakeney in The Scarlet Pimpernel.  He is close to Darcy and very fond of Georgiana.  Dy holds the title "Earl of Westmarch", but refuses to use it out of shame for his father's misdeeds, which were covered up in exchange for Dy becoming a spy.

Charles Bingley is another good friend of Darcy's, who appears in Pride and Prejudice. A good-natured and wealthy young man, he is naive and somewhat easily  led, and Darcy is quite fond of and protective of him. He has fallen in love with Elizabeth Bennet's elder sister Jane, but Darcy - conscious of the risks to Bingley's social reputation that the Bennet family presents and ignorant of Jane Bennet's own feelings - attempts to prevent the union.  The novel emphasizes the Bingleys' status as nouveau riche, having gained wealth through trade.  This makes their social position somewhat precarious.  As Charles's friend, Darcy intends to both help them cement that status, by becoming landed gentry like himself, and avoid threats to it from connections with lower-ranking families.

Caroline Bingley is Charles Bingley's sister, who also appears in Pride and Prejudice. A snobbish and proud young woman, she holds the Bennet family and their society in some disdain. She has an unsubtle and unrequited romantic interest towards Darcy, which leads to many displays of jealousy on her part when he begins to show interest in Elizabeth Bennet.  Part of her motivation is the position of her family in social circles, the wealth having been recently gained through trade.  Wishing to move up in the eyes of society, she sees Darcy as her pathway to greater social status.

George Wickham is Darcy's nemesis, a childhood friend and seemingly charming young man whose true personality is duplicitous and untrustworthy. He attempted an elopement with Georgiana Darcy in order to cheat her out of her inheritance, and later - having joined the local militia - poisoned Elizabeth Bennet against Darcy with lies about Darcy's treatment of him. He is a central character in Pride and Prejudice, and although the character does not appear frequently within the trilogy in person, he is a significant background presence, and the effects of his actions and Darcy's anger towards him are frequently explored throughout the books.  When finally located by Darcy in London, Wickham is contemptuous of Lydia Bennett, claiming that she followed him when he left to avoid his gambling debts.  Darcy threatens him with debtors' prison to get him to marry Lydia.

Col. Richard Fitzwilliam, who appears as "Colonel Fitzwilliam" in Pride and Prejudice, is depicted as Darcy's first cousin, childhood friend and, to all intents and purposes, younger brother.  He is the younger son of the Earl of Matlock and Lady Matlock (Jane Austen did not title them Matlock. The first use of this title may have been in the 1995 BBC miniseries, when Mr Collins states that the son of the Earl of Matlock is about to visit the parsonage, referring to Colonel Fitzwilliam. It has since been used frequently in Pride and Prejudice fan fiction.) (the title is blanked in Austen's description).  His older brother holds the title of Viscount D'Arcy.  Fitzwilliam does not get on with his older brother, remembering his times visiting Pemberley as the best of his life.  He is generally in need of money, supplementing his income by playing Darcy at billiards and winning frequently.  Fitzwilliam assists Darcy in matters military, such as the matter of obtaining a commission in the regular army for Wickham.  In the third novel Darcy meets him at the officer's billet of the Royal Horse Guards regiment.

Mrs. Annesley is Georgiana Darcy's companion, replacing the treacherous Mrs. Younge, who conspired with Wickham.  She appears briefly in Pride and Prejudice, when Elizabeth, Georgiana, and Bingley's sisters await the start of a buffet at Pemberley.  Austen describes her as the lady with whom Georgiana lives in London.
In these novels Mrs. Annesley is a devout woman who influences Georgiana to embrace religion and charity as a way of forgetting Wickham's deceit.  In the last novel it is revealed that she is the widow of the Vicar of St. Dunstan's in London, a church in a poverty-stricken area of the capital.  Her husband, and his verger, were part of Dy Brougham's network of informants.

Lady Sylvanie Sayre, later Lady Monmouth, who does not appear in Pride and Prejudice, is a swindler and Irish revolutionary who briefly captivates Darcy.  After failing to seduce Darcy into marriage, she forms an alliance with his friend Lord Monmouth.  Lady Sylvanie then attempts to trap and blackmail Darcy into supporting her political schemes. Darcy contemplates her hate-blighted life and finds it uncomfortably like his own.

Tyke Tanner is a giant of a man, the sexton at St. Dunstan's church.  Dyfed Brougham tells Darcy to contact him while Dyfed is on a secret mission.  Tyke turns out to be an old friend of Darcy's valet, Fletcher.  Darcy asks him for help in locating Wickham, and later Tanner is Wickham's "escort" to the church where he marries Lydia.

Historical novels by series
American romance novels
Novels based on Pride and Prejudice
American novel series
American historical novels